Pelretin is a synthetic retinoid.  It was tested in the 1980s on animals in the hopes that it could be used to eliminate wrinkles.

References

Benzoic acids
Retinoids
Cyclohexenes